Sachini Ayendra Stanley, is a Sri Lankan film actress currently working in the Sinhala film industry. She won Miss Sri Lanka in 2003 and represented Sri Lanka at the 53rd Miss World Pageant in Sanya, China. After being crowned as Miss Sri Lanka, her first film, Aadaraneeya Wassaanaya, directed by Senesh Dissanaike Bandara, was released in 2004. She won the award for best supporting actress at Signis Sri Lanka Film Awards for her performance.

She made her television debut playing the title role in the drama ‘Hiruni' directed by Kumarasiri Abeykoon on Sirasa TV in 2005. Her stage debut was as the character Sarala in the play For Better or For Worse directed by Indu Dharmasena in 2009.
Sachini is the first Sri Lankan to compete in the world championships of performing arts in Los Angeles in the U.S. in 2016. She won two silver medals and one bronze for acting categories classical/open/contemporary.
She competed again in the world championships of performing arts in 2017 and won 4 bronze medals for acting Categories she also won an honorary mention for best national costume.

Early life and background
Sachini Ayendra was born in Kandy, Sri Lanka, the youngest child of David Stanley and Thamara Wadasinghe. She studied at the Hillwood College, Kandy, completing her advanced levels in arts. In addition she was a member of the young writers club, school choir, drama club, interact club, school debating team, English literary association and took swimming, tennis and rugby as a sport. Sachini was the winner of best model in Kandy at a pageant in 2002 and Miss Sri Lanka in 2003 and she represented Sri Lanka at the Miss World 2003 pageant. After finishing school she completed a successful modeling course by Lou-ching Wong and several workshops on acting.

Career
Sachini started her modeling career while still in school and her first special award was Best Model Kandy in 2002. Following that she appeared in many leading TV commercials of the Elephant House soft drink called Ride, the Sthree advertisement of the National Savings Bank in 2002. She later moved to Colombo to further her acting and modeling careers. Though her most popular character was played in the movie Adaraneeya Wassanaya, her break through performance was the movie Sankara as a poor girl working in sugar cane fields living in a remote village in Sri Lanka. Her performance in the movie ‘Heart FM’ in 2007 as a mentally disturbed girl also brought her a lot of praise and a merit award at the Signis Sri Lanka Film festival in 2009.

After winning the Miss Sri Lanka contest and best supporting actress award at the Signis Awards for Adaraneeya Wassanaya, she received her first nomination for Sarasaviya and Presidential Film Awards. Her second film Sankara was one of her best performances.

In 2021, she appeared in the Raffealla Fernando Celebrity Calendar along with many other Sri Lankan celebrities.

Filmography

As actress
{| class="wikitable"
! Year !! Film !! Role !! Notes
|-
| 2003 || Adaraneeya Wassanaya || Madhupani || Winner, Signis Sri Lanka Film Awards best supporting actress Nominated, Sarasaviya Awards best supporting actress  Nominated, Presidential Film Awards best supporting actress
|-
| 2006 || Sankara || Upamali || Winner, Signis Sri Lanka Film Awards -best Supporting actress
|-
| 2007 || Heart FM || Shakya || 
|-
| 2010 || Angara Dangara || Nadee || 
|-
| 2013 || Siri Parakum || Yonaka || 
|-
| 2017 || Swara || Nimanthi || 
|-
| 2017 || Nimnayaka Hudekalawa || Advertising executive || 
|-
| TBD  || Thanapathilage Gedara || || 
|-
| TBD || Megha ||  || 
|-
| 2019 || Womb || Muhurath || 
|}

As producer
2010 - Angara Dangara''

Television

References

External links

Sachini Ayendra at the Sri Lanka Cinema Database
Nita returns to production with new hope

1982 births
Burgher models
Living people
Miss World 2003 delegates
Actors from Kandy
Sinhalese actresses
Sinhalese models
Sri Lankan beauty pageant winners
Sri Lankan film actresses
Sri Lankan people of European descent
Alumni of Hillwood College